Beaumerie-Saint-Martin is a commune in the Pas-de-Calais department in the Hauts-de-France region in northern France.

Geography
A village situated some 1.5 miles (3 km) southeast of Montreuil-sur-Mer, on the D349 road.

Population

See also
Communes of the Pas-de-Calais department

References

Communes of Pas-de-Calais